Põltsamaa is a town in Põltsamaa Parish, Jõgeva County, Estonia. The town is situated on the Põltsamaa River, and features a 13th-century castle.

Gallery

References

External links

Former municipalities of Estonia
Cities and towns in Estonia
Populated places in Jõgeva County
Kreis Fellin